Golling is a surname. Notable people with the surname include:

Alexander Golling (1905–1989), German actor
Friedrich Golling (1883–1974), Austrian fencer